Paris 7000 is an American adventure drama series that aired on ABC from January 22 until March 26, 1970.

The show was a mid-season replacement for Harold Robbins' The Survivors starring George Hamilton.

Plot
A trouble shooter for the US State Department in Paris helps US citizens.

Cast
George Hamilton as Jack Brennan

Episodes

References

External links
Paris 7000 at IMDb

American Broadcasting Company original programming
American adventure drama television series
1970 American television series debuts
1970 American television series endings
Television series by Universal Television
English-language television shows
Television shows set in Paris